The 1993 OTB International Open was a combined men's and women's tennis tournament played on outdoor hard courts that was part of the World Series of the 1993 ATP Tour, and of the Tier III Series of the 1993 WTA Tour. It was played at Schenectady, New York in the United States from August 23 through August 30, 1993. Thomas Enqvist and Larisa Neiland won the singles titles.

Finals

Men's singles

 Thomas Enqvist defeated  Brett Steven 4–6, 6–3, 7–6(7–0)
 It was Enqvist's only title of the year and the 2nd of his career.

Women's singles

 Larisa Neiland defeated  Natalia Medvedeva 6–3, 7–5
 It was Savchenko's 1st singles title of the year and the 2nd and last of her career.

Men's doubles

 Bernd Karbacher /  Andrei Olhovskiy defeated  Byron Black /  Brett Steven 2–6, 7–6, 6–1
 It was Karbacher's only title of the year and the 2nd of his career. It was Olhovskiy's 4th title of the year and the 4th of his career.

Women's doubles

 Rachel McQuillan /  Claudia Porwik defeated  Florencia Labat /  Barbara Rittner 4–6, 6–4, 6–2

References